Axel Zwingenberger (born 7 May 1955) is a German blues and boogie-woogie pianist and songwriter.

Biography
Zwingenberger was born in Hamburg, West Germany, and enjoyed eleven years of classical piano training. After listening to recordings by pianists Pete Johnson, Albert Ammons, Meade "Lux" Lewis, he became a boogie-woogie musician. In 1974 he performed with pianists Hans-Georg Moeller, Vince Weber and Martin Pyrker at the First International Blues and Boogie Woogie Festival in Cologne, West Germany. They also played at the Stars of Boogie Woogie and the Hans Maitner festival.

A year later he signed with a record label, which released his solo albums Boogie Woogie Breakdown, Power House Boogie, and Boogie Woogie Live. He has worked with  Ray Bryant, Champion Jack Dupree, Lloyd Glenn, Lionel Hampton, Jay McShann, Joe Newman, Sammy Price, Big Joe Turner, Sippie Wallace, Charlie Watts, Vince Weber, Bill Wyman, and Mama Yancey. His publications include Boogie Woogie: Piano Solo, a book of twelve of his compositions transcribed.

A railfan since early childhood, he published photographs of steam locomotives in The Magic of Trains
 and established a non-profit group with the German Foundation for the Protection of Historical Monuments which works for the preservation of trains, such as the steam-powered DR 18 201.

In spring 2009, with English pianist Ben Waters, he renewed his relationship with Charlie Watts, drummer of The Rolling Stones. With bassist Dave Green, they played concerts under the name The ABC&D of Boogie Woogie. In June 2012 they released their first album, Live in Paris (Eagle 2012), and performed in New York City at Lincoln Center and the Iridium Jazz Club.

Selective discography

References

Further reading
 Cook, Richard and Morton, Brian. Penguin Guide to Jazz Recordings, 8th edition. Penguin Books, 2006 
 Kernfeld, Barry. The New Grove Dictionary of Jazz, 2nd edition, Vol 2. London: Grove, 2002
 Larkin, Colin. The Guinness Who's Who of Jazz. Enfield, Middlesex: Guinness Books, 1992 
 Silvester, Peter J. The Story of Boogie Woogie – A Left Hand Like God. Lanham, Maryland: Scarecrow Press, 2009

External links
Axel Zwingenberger's homepage
Interview with Axel Zwingenberger

1955 births
Living people
Musicians from Hamburg
Boogie-woogie pianists
Blues pianists
German jazz pianists
21st-century pianists